Christophe Beauregard (born January 9, 1966) is a French portrait photographer who started his photographic career in the commercial sector. Initially working as a portraitist for the press and advertising campaigns he then jointly develop and pursue of his personal creative impulse. He is currently recognized in France and abroad as a contemporary photographer focusing on key themes such as identity and individualism in post-modern societies.

Youth 

He left home to complete further studies in 'English Literature and Civilisation' at Université François Rabelais in Tours, where he focused on the narratives and the author's voices. 
Before completing his degree, Beauregard moved to Scotland in 1987 with the intention to teach French in a local high school. Aware of the Scottish mythological heritage, his newly found semantic approach encouraged a more dynamic creative urge. In search of an outlet, he attended painting classes and showed promising talent in portraiture.

Encouraged by his teacher, Beauregard continued his creative search on his return to France. He enrolled himself at the School of Fine Arts (Ecole Régionale des Beaux Arts) in Tours in 1990 where he decided to specialize in photography. Using the photograph as his chosen medium, he presented his first line of work titled "Pinder" (after the French circus) as his final project. A black and white series of circus artists' portraits in an August Sander's manner.

Photographic career

Commercial work 

Following his graduation from Beaux Arts, Beauregard moved to Paris in 1993 to start his working career as an assistant for Fabian Cevallos, a celebrity photographer. He was then admitted to work as an assistant in a paparazzi photographic agency, where he was responsible for the organisation of the studio as well as the selling of the photos (due to his proficiency in languages).
Throughout the 1990s Beauregard expanded his commercial creative profession by supplying magazines and celebrities with photographs. Working for magazines such as Libération, Le Monde, and Télérama, Beauregard also landed assignments such as professional head-shots for large corporations such as LVMH, Publicis, and Havas. Taking into account the public exposure of the latter job opportunities, Beauregard also promoted himself by photographing the socially famous such as Richard Price, Erwin Olaf, Dan Graham, and Georg Baselitz.

Decisive moment 

In 2003 Nicolas Thely, an art critic from Le Monde, and Hélène Sirven, a professor of Fine Arts at La Sorbonne, prompted the offer to exhibit Beauregard's first artistic series, Chirurgies. Held at the Bureau d'Hypothèses, salle Michel Journiac, From then on Beauregard decided to conduct jointly his commercial career and his personal artistic series.

Themes works

Notables portraits 
Laure Adler, Akhenaton, Mathieu Amalric, John Armleder, Yann Arthus-Bertrand, Georg Baselitz, Booba, Pascal Bruckner, John Cale, Philippe Decouflé, Dee Dee Bridgewater, Virginie Despentes, Emmanuelle Devos, Nicolas Duvauchelle, Fellag, Marie-Agnès Gillot, Michel Gondry, Dan Graham, Interpol, Aki Kaurismäki, Peter Klasen, Wolfgang Laib, Fabrice Luchini, Annette Messager, Philippe Meste, Takashi Miike, Jean-Pierre Mocky, Moebius, Peter Mullan, Sofi Oksanen, Erwin Olaf, Opus AKOBEN, Orlan, Jean d'Ormesson, Jean-Michel Othoniel, Richard Price, Atiq Rahimi, Yasmina Reza, Ugo Rondinone, Édith Scob, Alain Seban, Lhasa de Sela, Jorge Semprún, Michel Serrault, Ravi Shankar, Richard Shusterman, Simone Veil, Jacques Villeret, The Warlocks, Lambert Wilson…

Disguises and shams 

The notion of a dual personality is a recurring theme in Beauregard's work. Constantly questioning the principle of identity, the viewer is welcomed to participate in the act of deciphering.

Hush ... Hush 
Hush...Hush provides insight into the daring world of the paparazzi. It suggests the distance a photographer of this profession is willing to go to capture the more profitable photograph. With Hush...Hush, Christophe Beauregard exposes a paparazzi photographer's ruthless techniques of disguise that allow him to gain access to a celebrity.

Semantic Tramps 
Inspired by the drug addicts looming in his neighbourhood in Paris. Beauregard hired actors and a makeup artist to imitate the given situation. Incorporating theatrical aspects in his work, the power of perception is placed upon the viewer.

Devils in Disguise 
Through this series, Beauregard depicts the correlation of a boy's imagination with the cultural idols and cultural goods. Thus trying to show how the imaginations of our offspring are formatted within the cultural industry.

Blindness and diversion

It's getting dark 
This series, produced in the artist's studio puts tension in the body of women and men in a gesture of blindness. Beauregard asks them to cover their faces with clothing or fabric of their choice

Technomades

Le Meilleur des Mondes ? 
The translation of the series is Brave New World? and it emphasises on The Basiliade Association which aims to provide help to individuals who have been diagnosed with AIDS. 
In an attempt to raise awareness of social stigmas Beauregard introduces us to a collection of an employee directory of a particular kind. In which men and women, seropositive and seronegative people, migrants and residents, and heterosexuals and homosexuals rub shoulders.

Skin and anonymous artialisation

Review 
Review is a direct insight into the dual life led by several individuals who enjoy the art of theatre and music-hall. They are members of the Cercle Musical de Bergerac, an association of local civilians in France, who share a common enthusiasm for performance. They voluntarily write, choreograph, and design, both costumes and the set, before performing it in the local town hall.

Pentimento 
Welcomed into the private homes of the subjects within this body of work, we bear witness to the act of tattoo removal. Focusing on the cultural trend of body art and tattoos, it is interesting to see the reverse reaction. Acknowledging the fact that the title of this series is Italian for repentance in painting, Beauregard tries to photograph the space between the bodies and their homes.

Chirurgies 
Pictorially playing with the chiaroscuro technique, Beauregard invites us to a darkened and mysterious encounter with anonymous individuals who have been treated with plastic surgery. The pictures were taken after their plastic operations at the surgeon's practice. The viewer doesn't see scars. Technically these photographs have not been retouched by a software, yet simply retouched from the inside, by a surgical procedure.

Exhibitions

Personal exhibitions  
2014
 "Under cover", Galerie Golan Rouzkhosh, Paris, France
2011
 "Trompe le monde", solo show, Galerie Briobox, Paris, France
2010 
 "Devils in disguise", TPTP Art Espace, Paris, France
 "BLING!", Galerie Fnac, Paris, France
 "Technomades", Fondation Alcatel-Lucent, Naperville, Illinois, USA
2009
 "Las Vegas", Au Bon Marché Rive Gauche, Paris, France
 "Las Vegas", Festival Voices Off Arles, France
 "EllesVMH", LVMH, Paris, France
 "Technomades", Atrium Alcatel-Lucent, Paris, France             
2008
 "Semantic tramps", Galerie Madé, Paris, France
 "Semantic tramps", L'été photographique de Lectoure, Lectoure, France
 "Chirurgies", Galerie L'œil écoute, Limoges, France

Group exhibitions 
2017
 "Unforgettable (you!)"(curated by Inês Valle), NRProject, London, United Kingdom
2015
 "Le travail en corps, encore", L'Hippodrome de Douai, Douai, France
2014
 "Panorama 14", Golan Rouzkhosh Gallery, Paris, France
 "Paparazzi!" Photographes, Stars and artists, le Centre Pompidou-Metz, Metz, France
 "Paparazzi!" Photographes, Stars and artists, Schirn Kunsthalle de Francfort, Francfort, Germany
2013
 "Par nature", le CENTQUATRE-Paris, Paris, France
 "Exuvie", ENSBA, Tours, France
2012
 "Le couple à l'œuvre", Galerie Area, Paris, France
 "La nuit de l'Année", RIP Arles 2012, Arles, France
2011
 "Un artiste, une œuvre", la Galerie Briobox, Paris, France
 "Las Vegas", Itinéraires des photographes voyageurs, Bordeaux, France
2009
 "Technomades", la FFPE, Quebec
 "Transformation du paysage", La Nuit Blanche, Montréal, Canada
2008
 "EUROPE échelle 27", la Cité des Arts, Paris, France
2007
 "Biennale des Agents Associés", Musée des arts décoratifs de Paris, Paris, France
2004
 "Support de diffusion", Salle Journiac (espace d'exposition à l'université Paris 1), Paris, France

Bibliography

Publications 
2008 
 Semantic tramps, [13 photographies couleurs, texte d'Arlette Farge], Italie, Filigranes Éditions, septembre 2008
 EUROPE échelle 27, [150 photographies couleurs, textes Laura Serani et Michel Foucher], Italie, Signatures / Trans Photographic Press Paris, juin 2008
2006
 Chirurgies, [portfolio de 13 photographies couleurs, tirage de 8 exemplaires], France, Alice Travel Cie, 2006 
2005
 Manuel d'esthétique, [16 photographies couleurs, textes Vladimir Mitz et Nicolas Thély], France, Filigranes Éditions, novembre 2005

Productions 
2014 
 Ceux qui détiennent – Sam Francis, "In Lovely Blueness (N°1)", dans l'oeil d'Anastasia, [carte postale, 600 exemplaires édités], France, Centre Pompidou-Metz, novembre 2014
2010
 Devils in disguise – Luckibill, [poster édité en 125 tirages jet d'encre pigmentaire], France, Galerie TPTP Space, 2010

Other 
2014 
 Beauregard Christophe, "Hush...Hush" [1 photographie couleur], Paparazzi! Fotografen, Stars und Künstler, juin 2014
 Beauregard Christophe, "Hush...Hush" [6 photographies couleurs], Néon magazine, n°16, mars 2014
2013 
 Beauregard Christophe, "Technomades" [5 photographies couleurs], Place publique, n°25, Automne 2013
 Beauregard Christophe, "Semantic tramps" [1 photographie couleur], Le Monde des livres, n°21216, avril 2013
2012 
 Beauregard Christophe, "Repentirs" [1 photographie couleur], Néon magazine, n°3, juillet 2012
 Beauregard Christophe, "portrait de Jean-Claude Milner" [1 photographie couleur], Le Monde des livres, mai 2012
 Beauregard Christophe, "Mona Lisa / Sacré Coeur / La Sorbonne" [3 photographies noir & blanc], Obs/In, 2012
 Beauregard Christophe, "Le Meilleur des Mondes ?" [4 photographies couleurs], Libération Le Mag, janvier 2012
2010 
 Beauregard Christophe, "Technomades" [1 photographie couleur], Kill Screen, n°0, page de couverture, Hiver 2010
 Beauregard Christophe, "Mona Lisa" [1 photographie couleur], La culture distribuée, Scérén, page de couverture, novembre 2010
 Beauregard Christophe, "Technomades" [1 photographie couleur, Déjà là, octobre 2010
2009 
 Beauregard Christophe, "Technomades" [1 photographie couleur], CV82, été 2009
 Beauregard Christophe, "Las Vegas" [2 photographies couleurs], Esse Revue, n°67, Automne 2009
 Beauregard Christophe, "La chance" [2 photographies couleurs], Nuke, n°7, 2009
 Beauregard Christophe, "Semantic Tramps" [1 photographie couleur], Les Inrockuptibles, n°684, décembre 2009
2008 
 Beauregard Christophe, "Semantic tramps" [1 photographie couleur], Le Monde 2, juillet 2008
2006 
 Beauregard Christophe, "Portraits Chirurgie" [6 photographies couleurs], Le Monde 2, n°114, avril 2006
2003 
 Beauregard Christophe, "Istanbul" [10 photographies couleurs], Les Inrockuptibles, n°402, août 2003
2002
 Beauregard Christophe, "Cirque" [3 photographies noir & blanc et 1 photographie couleur], Beaux Arts magazine / Hors-série : Le cirque et les arts, juin 2002
1998
 Beauregard Christophe, "Photographies autour du Cirque" [8 photographies couleurs], Théâtre Aujourd'hui, CNDP, n°2, Hiver 1998

Etudes critiques 
2014
 Illouz Audrey, "Under Cover", catalogue Under Cover, GRK Gallery, novembre 2014
 "Christophe Beauregard", French Touch Magazine, G&G Editions, n°2, Automne 2014
 Guerrin Michel, "Le marché des images de paparazzi", catalogue Paparazzi! Photographes Stars et Artistes, Editions Centre Pompidou-Metz / Flammarion, janvier 2014
2012
 Avila Alin, "Feindre vrai", Le couple à l'oeuvre, Area revue)s(n°27, Automne 2012
2010 
 Thiéry Dominique, "Héros positifs", Le Journal du SIDA, n°216, juillet 2010
 Saint-Pierre François, "Inventer la présence", catalogue Inventer le présent, Les Abattoirs-Frac Midi-Pyrénées, Printemps 2010
2009
 Cagnart Jean-Jacques, "L'image au carré", Chasseur d'images, n°319, décembre 2009
 Baqué Dominique, L'effroi du présent – Figurer la violence, Flammarion, septembre 2009
2008
 Farge Arlette, Semantic tramps, Filigranes éditions, septembre 2008
2007 
 Lefort Gérard, "Misère en scène", Libération, août 2007
2005
 Thély Nicolas, "Technique d'effacement", Manuel d'Esthétique Filigranes éditions, novembre 2005
 "Nouvelle peau", Libération, août 2005
2004 
 Thély Nicolas, "Série limitée Chirurgies", L'Oeil, n°557,

References
 Katherine Tuider. Interview with Christophe Beauregard, May 19, 2014, Paris, France.
 Philippe Tonda. Interview with Christophe Beauregard, Devils in Disguise, 2010, Paris, France.

External links 
 Official website of Christophe Beauregard
 “Paparrazzi: Photographes, stars et artistes” show at Centre Pompidou-Metz
 Corbis archives
 Semantic tramps presentation – Youtube

1966 births
French photographers
Living people